John Blackburn,  (3 December 1947 – 1 October 2021) was a British Anglican priest and chaplain. He served as Archdeacon for the Army from 1999 to 2004 and Chaplain General of the Royal Army Chaplains' Department from 2000 to 2004. Before and after his service in the British Army, he was a parish priest in the Diocese of Monmouth of the Church in Wales.

Early life and education
Blackburn was born on 3 December 1947. In 1966, he entered St Michael's College, Llandaff, an Anglican theological college, to study theology and train for ordained ministry. During this time, he completed a Diploma of Theology (DipTh) at University College, Cardiff, and a Diploma in Pastoral Studies (DPS) at St Michael's.

Throughout his career, Blackburn continued his university studies. He graduated from the Open University, a university that specialises in part-time distance learning, with a Bachelor of Arts (BA) degree in 1988 and a Bachelor of Science (BSc) degree in 2004.

Ordained ministry
Blackburn was ordained in the Church in Wales as a deacon in 1971 and as a priest in 1972. From 1971 to 1976, he served his curacy at St Mary's Church, Risca in the Diocese of Monmouth. On 18 May 1973, he was commissioned into the Royal Army Chaplains' Department (RAChD), Territorial and Army Volunteer Reserve, as a Chaplain to the Forces 4th Class (equivalent in rank to captain); this meant that he served as a part-time military chaplain in addition to his parish ministry.

On 30 January 1976, Blackburn was granted a short service commission in the British Army thereby beginning his service as a full-time military chaplain. On 30 January 1981, he transferred to a regular commission. He was promoted to Chaplain to the Forces 3rd Class (equivalent in rank to major) on 30 January 1982, and to Chaplain to the Forces 2nd Class on 1 January 1990 (equivalent in rank to lieutenant colonel).

On 10 May 1999, Blackburn was appointed Deputy Chaplain General and promoted to brigadier. As the most senior Anglican chaplain in the RAChD, he was appointed the Archdeacon for the Army in 1999. On 13 May 2000, he was appointed Chaplain General and promoted to major general. He retired from the British Army on 30 July 2004.

After leaving the military, Blackburn returned to the Diocese of Monmouth. From 2004 to 2013, he was Vicar of St Mary's Church, Risca; this was the same parish where he had served his curacy three decades earlier. He retired from full-time ministry on 15 July 2013. Since 2014, he held permission to officiate in the Diocese of Swansea and Brecon.

Personal life
In 1970, Blackburn married Anne Elisabeth Woodcock. Together they have two daughters.

Blackburn died on 1 October 2021, aged 73.

Honours
On 30 September 1996, Blackburn was appointed an Honorary Chaplain to the Queen (QHC). In the 2004 New Year Honours, he was appointed Companion of the Order of the Bath (CB).

From 2001 to 2004, Blackburn was an honorary canon of Ripon Cathedral; he was canon emeritus from 2004.

References

1947 births
2021 deaths
Alumni of St Michael's College, Llandaff
20th-century Welsh Anglican priests
21st-century Welsh Anglican priests
Church of England archdeacons (military)
Chaplains General to the Forces
Honorary Chaplains to the Queen
Companions of the Order of the Bath
Alumni of the Open University